Major , or just "Major", is the main protagonist in Masamune Shirow's Ghost in the Shell manga and anime series. She is a synthetic "full-body prosthesis" augmented-cybernetic human employed as the field commander of Public Security Section 9, a fictional anti-cybercrime law-enforcement division of the Japanese National Public Safety Commission. Being strong-willed, physically powerful, and highly intelligent cyberhero, she is well known for her skills in deduction, hacking and military tactics.

Conception and creation
Motoko Kusanagi's body was designed by the manga author and artist Masamune Shirow to be a mass production model so she would not be conspicuous. Her electrical and mechanical system within is special and features parts unavailable on the civilian market. Shirow intentionally chose this appearance so Motoko would not be harvested for those parts.

Character
In the 1995 anime film adaptation, character designer and key animator supervisor Hiroyuki Okiura made her different from her original manga counterpart, stating, "Motoko Kusanagi is a cyborg. Therefore her body is strong and youthful. However her human mentality is considerably older than she looks. I tried to depict this maturity in her character instead of the original girl created by Masamune Shirow." In nearly all portrayals, Kusanagi is depicted as a self-made woman. She is a fiercely independent and capable leader who has proven herself under fire countless times.

Kenji Kamiyama had a difficult time identifying her and could not understand her motives during the first season of the anime series Ghost in the Shell: Stand Alone Complex. Due to this, he created an episode in the second season where he recounted her past. He was then able to describe her as a human who was chosen to gain this superhuman power; she probably believes that she has an obligation to use that ability for the benefit of others. English voice actor and director Mary Elizabeth McGlynn states she loved playing the role of Motoko Kusanagi and described her as "someone [who] was that strong, and still kind of feminine at times, but also kick-ass".

Abilities
Neurobiology, cybernetics and computer technology have advanced to such a point that most people possess "neuro-cyberbrains"—a technological "organic-synthetic" wetware computer user interface implant located in the suboccipital nerve region of the cranium; this allows their minds to seamlessly interact with mobile devices, machines or networks around them. The neuro-cyberbrain revolutionized education and has made training in any task simply a matter of uploading the proper data. The military uses the technology to train their soldiers into veterans within days. Civilians use it to become adept at their jobs and learn new hobbies. In some cases of extreme trauma, it is possible to replace large segments of the brain and body with prosthetic counterparts.

Major Motoko Kusanagi is one such person, living in a full-body prosthesis after an accident as a child; her only organic parts are her brain and spinal cord. Her current prosthetic body looks like a generic product, but is actually military grade.

In every anime iteration, Section 9 has been all-male excepting the Major who leads the team. The Arise series details Kusanagi forming the current team roster to her own specifications. She forms and leads Section 9 because she is the most capable member of the team.

Kusanagi is a leading expert in fourth-generation warfare and cyberbrain combative warfare. As the most heavily mechanized member of Section 9, she is regarded among her peers as the best hand-to-hand melee fighter and the most skilled "hacker and net diver." Chief Aramaki described her abilities as "...rarer than 'ESP'; the kind of person that government agencies hire to assassinate without leaving a trace." Classified as "Wizard Class" grey hat, her computer security hacking skills allow her brain–computer interface consciousness to control two-external humanoid "drone"-robots remotely with the ability to move her "ghost" from host to host. Kusanagi repeatedly demonstrates uncanny ability to hack people's wetware protected with military-grade malware protection and counter-measures, allowing her to "see through their eyes," disable their vocal systems, or even take control of their bodies altogether. As a cyborg, Kusanagi is able to perform numerous superhuman feats, such as demonstrating superhuman strength, leaping between skyscrapers, advanced acrobatics, or shooting down a bullet after it was fired at mid-range.

Background
Little is known of Motoko Kusanagi's early history. Only hints at some of her background, usually through flashbacks, and nearly always from the points of view of others; rarely from Kusanagi's herself. The Stand Alone Complex television series establishes that Motoko Kusanagi has lived within cyborg “shells” practically since birth. The Arise video series confirms that Motoko Kusanagi earned her military rank “Major” by serving in the JGSDF. Motoko Kusanagi earned her reputation as “Fire Starter,” a master computer hacker, through years of experience and activity. Kusanagi is often portrayed wearing provocative dress and attire (or lack of attire) and experiments with "human vices" in an attempt to understand that part of her humanity, and in particular her femininity.

Kusanagi's various incarnations in the different manga or movies or TV series all portray her differently. In the original manga, Kusanagi's portrayal differs from that of the film-versions; she has a much more slapstick, vivacious, and sexy personality. Since each of these have independent storylines, the physical and mental characteristics of Motoko Kusanagi has been modified in different ways to reflect the focus of the story; these changes are reflected in the different ways that artists draw her.

The 2nd Gig episode "Kusanagi's Labyrinth – AFFECTION" portrays a youthful Kusanagi who was involved in a plane crash, the only other survivor of which was Hideo Kuze who later became a member of the "Individual Eleven." After spending an undefined period of time in a coma, Kusanagi's "ghost" was transferred into a fully cybernetic-prosthetic body without her prior consent. After this, she visited a now paralyzed Hideo Kuze in hospital and eventually convinced him to undergo the cyberization procedure himself. At the end of the series, Kusanagi confesses that she can't remember what her real name was, indicating that Motoko Kusanagi is actually a pseudonym.

Relationships
In Ghost in the Shell, Kusanagi participates in a lesbian sex splash panel, involving Kurutan and Ran, and has a boyfriend. The unnamed boyfriend works for Section One, and they have been dating for seven months; to which Batou considers this "a new record". In Ghost in the Shell S.A.C. 2nd GIG, Episode 17 – "DI Mother and Child – RED DATA", having taken an adolescent male to a hotel after rescuing him from yakuza, both share the same bed for the night. The boy asks Motoko if cyborgs can still have sex, to which Motoko responds "You care to find out?"

Motoko shares a strong bond with and respect for her partner Batou, with whom she has worked in several missions; it is heavily implied the two are in love with one another.

Heterosexual "E-sex" is rather painful, as depicted in the splash panel. It is also an illegal act and lucrative "side business" for Motoko, as stated by Masamune Shirow in the back of the manga collection. "Same gender/sex" cyborg-compatibility are rarely an issue, as the user(s)' interfaced nervous systems allow shared simultaneous sensations; such intimate connections have the potential for serious medical complications for user(s) of "Opposing sex/gender" compatibility, as illustrated by the accidental arrival of Batou (who is male).  Shirow stated in his poster-book, Intron Depot 1, that "I drew an all-girl orgy because I didn't want to draw some guy's butt." The lesbian sex splash panel was cut from the original American release of the manga, as it would have entailed giving the book an "adults only" rating. Ultimately, Shirow decided it wasn't important to the plot. In the second edition, released in 2004, the scene is completely unedited.

Appearances

In print

Manga series
Motoko is a commanding presence when on assignment, but also trades insults with her troops. She constantly calls Aramaki "Ape Face" as well as other members in Public Security Section 9, and when the Puppet Master reveals the "Motokos" that exist in the minds of those who know her, Aramaki's "Motoko" is sticking her tongue out. She is very light-hearted and immature on some occasions. Due to the Puppeteer case, she started to change and became much more serious.

In the sequel, Ghost in the Shell 2: Man/Machine Interface, a person known as Motoko Aramaki appears. She identifies herself as containing "Motoko Kusanagi" elements, along with Project 2501, the Puppeteer. She is also identified as "Motoko 11" hinting that there is more than one.

A second character is also introduced in Ghost in the Shell 2: Man/Machine Interface named Millennium, who controls a group named "Stabat Mater" that is researching a process known as "Brain Expansion". This research is apparently called off after Millennium is taken over by Motoko Aramaki. At this time Millennium is revealed to be "'No. 20' (Millennium)," indicating that Millennium is another of the Motoko Kusanagi/Project 2501 hybrid entities.

In film

Animated films
In the 1995 animated film Ghost in the Shell by Mamoru Oshii, the Major's design is significantly different from her original manga appearance. Unlike her manga counterpart, the Major has an androgynous face and rarely shows emotion. Like the manga, Public Security Section 9 investigate the crimes of a genius hacker called the Puppet Master. Kusanagi is frequently portrayed in the film as contemplative and brooding, in contrast to the down-to-earth nature of her partner Batou. Since she has a full cybernetic body, she is not certain her "ghost" retains any humanity and speculates on the possibility that she is entirely synthetic intelligence, with artificially generated memories and emotions designed to "fool her" into thinking she was once human. Throughout the movie, she seeks to find answers to her questions and finally meets the Puppet Master, a rogue AI who became sentient and who is also looking for existential meaning. In the climax of the film, Kusanagi and the Puppet Master "merge" to form a "newborn": an entirely new entity that exists free of physical boundaries and can propagate itself through the Net.

In the 2004 follow-up Ghost in the Shell 2: Innocence, picking up three years after the events of the original movie, the Major herself does not appear. Throughout the film, the Major makes her first "true" appearance in Kim's manor, where she breaks into the hallway component of Kim's looping false memories and inserts herself (represented by the child's prosthetic body she inhabited at the end of the first movie), and provides clues to alert Batou to Kim's attempted "ghost-hack" on himself and Togusa. The Major's "ghost" eventually returns in person to help Batou on the Locus Solus gynoid factory ship. Using a satellite transmission, she attempts to download her "ghost" into one of the Hadaly gynoid production models—however, due to the insufficient memory of the gynoid's e-brain, she is only able to download a fraction of her full "ghost" into the doll. (She notes with marked disdain that the gynoid had barely enough memory for her combat protocols.) Her personality has not changed much from the first movie—she still retains her fondness for philosophy and her considerable skills in battle, though she has also gained the Puppet Master's formidable hacking abilities. In a climactic sequence, she tears apart her mechanical body in the process of opening the ship's CPU hatch in order to hack into it. After successfully locking down the ship and uncovering the truth behind the conspiracy, Kusanagi prepares to once again disappear into the Net, but reassures a despondent Batou that whenever he logs in, she will always be beside him.

Live-action film
In the 2017 DreamWorks Pictures Ghost in the Shell live-action movie directed by Rupert Sanders, Scarlett Johansson portrays Motoko, who is initially introduced as Mira Killian (who shares the same initials). It is revealed at the end of the film that she was originally a teenage Japanese girl and activist named Motoko Kusanagi (portrayed by Kaori Yamamoto) who had run away from home one year prior to the events of the film. While living with other critics of cyborg technology in what is referred to as the Lawless Region, she is kidnapped by agents of the Hanka Robotics corporation, who perform experiments upon her and place her brain inside a cybernetic body. In effect, this makes her the first full-body cyborg to be successfully developed. Upon awakening inside her new body, Kusanagi is told that her name is Mira Killian and that her family was killed in a terrorist attack. She is also given false memories and subsequently employed by Section 9. Mira later discovers the secret behind her creation from the film's initial antagonist Kuze, who also underwent experimentation, as well as Dr. Ouelet, who played a primary role in developing her prosthetic body. With the help of Section 9, she consents to having Cutter, the Hanka executive trying to murder her, killed by her boss, Aramaki.

In television

Stand Alone Complex

The Major retains much of her personality from the manga in the anime series Ghost in the Shell: Stand Alone Complex and its followup Ghost in the Shell: S.A.C. 2nd GIG, although she is not disrespectful toward the Chief like she is in the manga. As in the manga and unlike the movies, where she had black hair and blue-grey eyes, she now has blue-purple hair and red-violet eyes. Throughout the series, The Major maintains her signature commanding presence and authority. Among the various members of Section 9, Kusanagi is usually the one Chief Aramaki singles out to accompany him on official and off the record business. Kusanagi's personal life is not shown much in the first season. She underwent cyberization at a very early age and had trouble adapting to the use of her body which resulted in her inadvertently breaking one of her favorite dolls. She keeps a wrist watch as proof of her past.

In the first season, Kusanagi started questioning the use of the Tachikoma sentient tanks, due to them showing signs of individuality and curiosity not suited for combat. Ultimately, she decides to have them stripped of their weaponry and sent back to the lab that manufactured them for analysis and further work. When the Tachikoma sacrificed themselves to save Batou, Major Kusanagi understands that she was wrong in halting the usage of the Tachikoma and proposes that they might have evolved to have ghosts themselves.

In the second season her past was revealed. She was once a little girl who had been in a plane crash causing her to be in a coma. A boy who was also a victim of the plane crash continuously made origami cranes using only his left hand, as much of his body was paralyzed in the accident, in hopes of giving them to her when she woke up. Motoko was eventually taken away when medical complications occurred. The boy thought she had died, but she was actually being cyberized and given a full prosthetic body. When she returned to see the boy, the boy did not recognize her and ignored her. When she left the hospital, the boy realized she was the girl in the coma and made a decision to get cyberized and look for her, but he never saw her again. Throughout the second season, the Major and Section 9 go against a terrorist group called "The Individual Eleven". Believing it to be another stand alone complex they unwillingly teamed up with Kazundo Gouda in order to figure out their motive. When the 11 leaders of the individual eleven reveal themselves, they all kill each other except for Hideo Kuze. It was later revealed that Hideo Kuze was the little boy who Motoko once knew as a child; this discovery caused her some emotional confusion.

In the Ghost in the Shell: Stand Alone Complex: Solid State Society OVA, the Major has left Section 9 for two years and does not appear much in the first half of the film. She first appears on a building jumping off into the darkness. She shows up later as Chroma, to warn Batou to stay away from the "Solid State Society". She returns to her normal body after "Chroma" re-stores herself in the recharging chamber. She is suspected of being the Puppeteer, but is no longer suspected when she rescues Togusa from a (coerced) suicide attempt. She leads Section 9 on a raid to find the Puppeteer. At the end of Solid State Society, she repeats her famous line, "The net is truly vast and infinite."

Arise
In the Ghost in the Shell: Arise (2013) OVA series, Motoko is completely redesigned from her previous incarnations, as are all members of the main character cast. Her cybernetic body is shown as far younger in appearance and shorter in height to other versions, resembling a teenager or young adult and not much taller than Chief Aramaki. Her hair is blue and cut in a close, straight bang form, and she is usually shown wearing full red leather pants and jackets and high heel boots.

Ghost in the Shell: SAC 2045 
The Major appears in a CGI Japanese/American animated series SAC 2045, released in 2020. This series is set after previous events, and sees Public Section 9 hire themselves out as mercenaries.

In video games

Motoko is a player character in Ghost in the Shell (1997) for the PlayStation, Ghost in the Shell: Stand Alone Complex (2004) for the PlayStation 2, Ghost in the Shell: Stand Alone Complex (2005) for the PlayStation Portable, and Ghost in the Shell: Stand Alone Complex - First Assault Online (2016) for Microsoft Windows.

Reception
Motoko Kusanagi was well received by media. Motoko ranked 13th in IGN's list of the top anime characters of all time in 2009, commenting that "though she may be cool, professional, and mostly artificial, she's unquestionably human, and following her adventures through Ghost in the Shell was never less than fascinating". In 2014, IGN ranked her as the 11th greatest anime character of all time, saying that "Motoko was a stunning example of a strong female character that didn't need to have her feminism make a statement." Motoko's female identity and appearance is countered by the autonomous subjectivity, resulting in a "male" cyborg body which cannot menstruate. The original film depicts Motoko's identity and ontological concerns with the evolution of a being, resulting in full subjectivity, through a new form of reproduction with the Puppet Master. Austin Corbett commented on the lack of sexualization from her team as freedom from femininity, noting that Motoko is "overtly feminine, and clearly non-female". Mania.com her as the 4th most skilled gunslinger in anime citing how strong she is regardless of her several appearances in media.

Notes

References

Further reading

Action film characters
Anime and manga characters with superhuman strength
Martial artist characters in anime and manga
Comics characters introduced in 1989
Female characters in anime and manga
Female characters in comics
Female characters in film
Fictional androgynes
Fictional characters from Kantō
Fictional characters who can turn invisible
Fictional computer security specialists
Fictional cyborgs
Fictional electronic engineers
Fictional detectives
Fictional activists
Fictional intelligence analysts
Fictional Japan Ground Self-Defense Force personnel
Fictional Japanese people in anime and manga
Fictional Japanese police detectives
Fictional mass murderers
Fictional police majors
Fictional female majors
Fictional private military members
Fictional characters with neurotrauma
Fictional characters with eidetic memory
Fictional Japanese police officers
Fictional sole survivors
Fictional super soldiers
Fictional technopaths
Fictional United Nations personnel
Fictional World War IV veterans
Ghost in the Shell characters
Time travelers
Female soldier and warrior characters in anime and manga